Daqiu Island (Ta Chiu/Tachiu) (Foochow Romanized: Duâi-kiŭ-dō̤) is an island in the East China Sea, part of Beigan Township, Lienchiang County (the Matsu Islands), Fujian Province, Republic of China (Taiwan). The island has been uninhabited; it is open to the public. The smaller Xiaoqiu Island is located to the northeast of Daqiu Island.

In October 2020, a bridge between Daqiu Island and Beigan Island was under construction.

Overview
The Lienchiang County government operates a ferry service to the island during the summer. The island can be reached during the off season by chartering a boat.

The island is known for its population of Formosan sika deer. A toxic invasive plant species, Solanum pseudocapsicum, now occupies nearly ten percent of the area of the island and is a threat to the deer population.

A school that was built on the island in 1965 is now abandoned.

Demographics
During the 20th century, several hundred residents and military personnel lived on the island.

, 280 people from 45 families lived on the island. 

On the afternoon of April 7, 1990, Chen Chin-Kuan and his family left the island to live on Beigan (Peikan), leaving only military personnel remaining on the island.

In 1996, the defense forces left the island. On August 15, 1998, the military personnel stationed on the island left the island, leaving the island uninhabited.

Since that time, one person has taken up residence on the island.

Gallery

See also
 Cisco, Utah, another ghost town with one modern resident
 List of islands in the East China Sea
 List of islands of Taiwan
 The similarly named Daqiu and Xiaoqiu of Wuqiu, Kinmen

References

External links
北竿梅花鹿大坵島 台灣海上奈良 part1 台灣1001個故事 ('Formosan Sika Deer on Daqiu Island in Beigan- Taiwan's Nara on the Sea, part 1; Taiwan's 1,001 Stories series') 

Ghost towns in Taiwan
Islands of Fujian, Republic of China
Matsu Islands